Midnight Lace is a 1960 American neo noir mystery thriller film directed by David Miller and starring Doris Day, Rex Harrison, and John Gavin. The plot centers on a woman who is threatened by an anonymous stalker but has a hard time convincing others of what is happening. The screenplay by Ivan Goff and Ben Roberts was based on the play Matilda Shouted Fire by Janet Green. The new title referred to a lacy dress that Day's character purchases early in the film and wears at the climax.

A television film remake of Midnight Lace, starring Mary Crosby and Gary Frank, premiered on NBC on February 9, 1981.

Plot
American heiress Kit Preston and her British business owner husband Tony live in a wealthy neighborhood of London in a building undergoing major renovation construction. Returning home in a dense fog, Kit is startled by an unseen eerie male voice that threatens to kill her. The following day, Tony's assistant, Daniel Graham, notifies Tony that he has been looking at the books of Tony's company, and it appears a large sum of money has been embezzled from their firm.

Kit begins receiving phone calls from the same threatening voice. Tony and Kit report the incidents to Scotland Yard, but Inspector Byrnes dismissively attributes the case to Kit's imaginative way of getting her husband's attention. Kit's Aunt Bea arrives for a visit and upon seeing Kit's nervousness, Bea becomes concerned for Kit's well-being. After several more incidents, Tony and Bea insist that Kit see a psychiatrist.

The voice finally announces he is coming to kill Kit. Tony pretends to leave to lure in the stalker, but shortly returns. A gunman enters and takes a bullet in the ensuing struggle with Tony. The voice, however, is still heard coming from a tape recorder. Tony now turns on Kit and confesses he has been gaslighting Kit with help from his lover, their neighbor Peggy, in a scheme to kill her for the money to cover up his embezzlement. Terrified for her life, Kit runs through the balcony high onto the construction site and is rescued by the construction foreman, Brian Younger. Tony is arrested by Byrnes, who had tapped the Prestons' phone and realized that Kit's fear was real and that Tony was the mastermind.

Cast

Production
The film was based on the play Matilda Shouted Fire by Janet Green. In August 1958, it was touring the provinces in Britain but had not arrived in London when Universal announced they had acquired the screen rights as a vehicle for Doris Day. In March 1959, Ben Roberts and Ivan Goff signed to write the script. The film would be done as a co-production between Universal and Arwin, the company of Day's husband.

In February 1960, the title was changed to Midnight Lace.

Critical reception
The Time critic called the film:

another of those recurrent thrillers (Sorry, Wrong Number; Gaslight; The Two Mrs. Carrolls; Julie) in which a dear, sweet, innocent girl is pursued by a shadowy figure of evil who threatens her with all sorts of insidious molestation...Like its predecessors, Midnight Lace is not very interesting in itself, but it is uncomfortably fascinating when considered as one of the persistent fantasies of a monogamous society...False leads trail off in at least seven directions, but the climax of the film will come to most mystery buffs as no surprise...Doris Day wears a lot of expensive clothes, and in attempting to portray the all-American missus behaves like such a silly, spoiled, hysterical, middle-aged female that many customers may find themselves less in sympathy with her plight than with the villain's murderous intentions.

Variety wrote:

In a Ross Hunter effort the emphasis is on visual satisfaction. The idea seems to be to keep the screen attractively filled. First and foremost, it is mandatory to have a lovely and popular star of Doris Day's calibre. She is to be decked out in an elegant wardrobe and surrounded by expensive sets and tasteful furnishings. This is to be embellished by highly dramatic lighting effects and striking hues, principally in the warmer yellow-brown range of the spectrum. The camera is to be maneuvered, whenever possible, into striking, unusual positions...The effervescent Day sets some sort of record here for frightened gasps. Harrison Is capable. Director David Miller adds a few pleasant little humorous touches and generally makes the most of an uninspired yarn.

Awards and nominations
Doris Day was nominated for the Golden Globe Award for Best Actress - Motion Picture Drama. Irene Lentz was nominated for the Academy Award for Best Color Costume Design.

Home media
Universal first released Midnight Lace on VHS in 1996. In 2014, the film was released on DVD through the Turner Classic Movies Vault Collection, with a 1.85:1 video aspect ratio and bonus features like a special film introduction from TCM, movie trailer (formatted for widescreen), and image stills and photos; this was re-released on March 11, 2015 as a barebone film-only DVD. The film was released by Universal directly as a stand-alone DVD and in the Doris Day: The Essential Collection, which features 5 other films starring Doris Day (Pillow Talk, Lover Come Back, The Thrill of It All, Send Me No Flowers, and The Man Who Knew Too Much); these releases have no bonus features but have optional English subtitles and present the film in a 2.00:1 ratio.

A licensed Blu-ray version was released on June 25, 2019 by Kino International under its subsidiary Kino Lorber Studio Classics. It contains the film in two different widescreen ratios (2:1 and 1.78:1), theatrical trailer (in full screen), film commentary by Kat Ellinger, and optional English subtitles. There are also Region 2 releases for both DVD and Blu-ray.

See also
 List of American films of 1960

References

External links

 
 
 
 
 
 Review of film at Variety (October 19, 1960)

1960 films
1960 drama films
1960s English-language films
1960s mystery drama films
1960s mystery thriller films
1960s psychological drama films
1960s psychological thriller films
1960s thriller drama films
Adultery in films
American films based on plays
American mystery drama films
American mystery thriller films
American neo-noir films
American psychological drama films
American psychological thriller films
American thriller drama films
Films about stalking
Films directed by David Miller
Films produced by Ross Hunter
Films scored by Frank Skinner
Films set in London
Universal Pictures films
1960s American films